Yury Nikolayevich Grigorovich (born 2 January 1927 in Leningrad) is a Soviet and Russian dancer and choreographer who dominated the Russian ballet for 30 years.

Grigorovich was born into a family connected with the Imperial Russian Ballet. He graduated from the Leningrad Choreographic School in 1946 and danced as a soloist of the Kirov Ballet until 1962. His staging of Sergey Prokofiev's The Stone Flower (1957) and of The Legend of Love (1961) brought him acclaim as a choreographer. In 1964 he moved to the Bolshoi Theatre, where he would work as an artistic director until 1995. His most famous productions at the Bolshoi were The Nutcracker (1966), Spartacus (1967), and Ivan the Terrible (1975). He controversially reworked Swan Lake to produce a happy end for the story in 1984. In 1995, he was accused of having allowed the theatre to plunge into stagnation and after many a squabble was ousted from office. Thereupon he choreographed for various Russian companies before settling in Krasnodar, where he set up his own company. Grigorovich has been heading the juries of numerous international competitions in classical ballet. After the death of his wife, the great ballerina Natalia Bessmertnova, on 19 February 2008, he was offered the opportunity to return to the Bolshoi again in the capacity of ballet master and choreographer.

Honours and awards
 1957 - Honoured Artist of the RSFSR
 1957 - Medal "In Commemoration of the 250th Anniversary of Leningrad"
 1959 - Order nip
 1966 - People's Artist of the RSFSR
 1969 - Award of Sergei Diaghilev of the Paris Academy of Dance
 1970 - Jubilee medal "For Valiant Labour. To commemorate the 100th anniversary of the birth of Vladimir Ilyich Lenin"
 1970 - Lenin Prize
 1973 - People's Artist of the USSR
 1976 - Order of Lenin
 1977 - Order of Saints Cyril and Methodius, 1st class (Bulgaria)
 1977 - USSR State Prize
 1977 - Medal "100 years of Bulgaria's Liberation from Ottoman slavery"
 1980 - Honorary Citizen of Varna
 1981 - Order of the October Revolution
 1981 - People's Artist of the Uzbek SSR
 1983 - State Prize of the Uzbek SSR
 1985 - USSR State Prize - for the creation of artistic and athletic programs of the XII World Youth and Student Festival in Luzhniki, Moscow
 1986 - Hero of Socialist Labour
 1986 - Order of Lenin
 1987 - Order of the People's Republic of Bulgaria, 1st class
 1995 - Honoured Artist of Kazakhstan
 1996 - People's Artist of the Republic of Bashkortostan
 1997 - Vaslav Nijinsky Medal (Ministry of Culture of Poland)
 2001 - Order of the Arts' Amber Cross ", the highest award of the Russian Academy of Arts and musical performance
 2002 - Order of Merit for the Fatherland, 3rd class - for outstanding contribution to the development of choreographic art
 2002 - "Badge poshani" (Honor), the highest award of the mayor of Kyiv
 2002 - Badge of "370 years of Yakutia in Russia"
 2002 - Fyodor Volkov award for his contribution to the theatrical art of the Russian Federation
 2003 - National Theatre Prize Golden Mask in nomination "For the honour and dignity"
 2003 - Badge of "civic virtue" of the Republic of Sakha (Yakutia)
 2003 - Medal of the "Hero of Labour of Kuban" (Krasnodar region)
 2004 - Order of Merit (Ukraine), third class
 2004 - Medal of the National Opera of Ukraine to the 100th anniversary of Serge Lifar
 2004 - Badge of Honor of the Ministry of Culture and the Arts "for his personal contribution to the development of art"
 2005 - The highest theatrical award of St. Petersburg "Gold soffit"
 2005 - Order of Dostyk
 2006 - Award "Russian National Olympus" in nomination "Man epoch", medal "For the honor and valor"
 2006 - Ludvig Nobel Prize
 2007 - Order of Merit for the Fatherland, 2nd class - for outstanding contribution to the development of domestic and international choreographic art, many years of creative activity
 2007 - Order of Francisc Skorina
 2008 - Ovation
 2009 - Medal of Honour (Armenia)
 2011 - Order of Merit for the Fatherland, 1st class

References

Choreographers of Bolshoi Theatre
Russian male ballet dancers
Musicians from Saint Petersburg
Recipients of the Order "For Merit to the Fatherland", 1st class
Recipients of the Order "For Merit to the Fatherland", 2nd class
Recipients of the Order "For Merit to the Fatherland", 3rd class
Honored Artists of the RSFSR
People's Artists of the RSFSR
People's Artists of the USSR
Honorary Members of the Russian Academy of Arts
Recipients of the Order of Lenin
Recipients of the USSR State Prize
Heroes of Socialist Labour
Recipients of the Order of Francysk Skaryna
1927 births
Living people
Prix Benois de la Danse jurors
Soviet male ballet dancers